George Frederick Arthur Grimes (June 29, 1877 – August 10, 1929) was a businessman and political figure in the Colony of Newfoundland. He represented Port de Grave from 1913 to 1919, Fogo from 1923 to 1924, Twillingate from 1924 to 1928 and Lewisporte from 1928 to 1929 in the Newfoundland House of Assembly.

He was born in Channel, the son of William Grimes and Amelia White. The family moved to St. John's when Grimes was twelve after his father, a policeman, was posted there. He was employed as a clerk from 1890 until 1902, when he became a department manager for retail firm George Knowling Limited. In 1900, he married Annie Clarke. In 1906, Grimes helped form the Newfoundland Socialist Society; he also served as financial secretary for the St John's Trades and Labour Council in 1908. He is credited with exposing a future Newfoundland prime minister Joey Smallwood to socialism. A supporter of the Fishermen's Protective Union, he became manager of the dry goods department in the Union Trading Company in 1912 and, in 1913, was elected to the House of Assembly in Port de Grave as an FPU representative. In 1914, Grimes helped form the Newfoundland Socialist League. He was invited to become a member of the Executive Council in 1917 and served on Newfoundland's board of food control during World War I. Grimes was defeated by John Chalker Crosbie when he ran for reelection in 1919. He was elected again in 1923 and served in the cabinet as Minister of Marine and Fisheries from 1923 to 1924. Grimes died in office in St. John's at the age of 52 after suffering an "apoplectic attack".

References

External links 

Fishermen's Protective Union MHAs
1877 births
1929 deaths
People from Channel-Port aux Basques
Businesspeople from the Dominion of Newfoundland
Dominion of Newfoundland politicians